The name Kong-rey has been used to name four tropical cyclones in the western north Pacific The name was contributed by Cambodia and is the name of a mountain and also of a girl from a Khmer legend.
 Typhoon Kong-rey (2001) (T0106, 09W)
 Typhoon Kong-rey (2007) (T0701, 01W)
 Tropical Storm Kong-rey (2013) (T1315, 14W, Nando)
 Typhoon Kong-rey (2018) (T1825, 30W, Queenie) – A Category 5 super typhoon that affected Japan and South Korea.

Pacific typhoon set index articles